Abundio Martínez (February 8, 1875 – April 26, 1914) was a Mexican musician and composer. He was born on February 8, 1875, in Huichapan. His father was a carpenter and band director. He taught Abundio carpentry skills and various instruments such as trumpet, violin and drum. The whole family, seeking a better life, relocated to Mexico City. Abundio liked to listen to a band directed by Sappers Miguel Rios Toledano rehearsing on Corregidora Street. He joined a band, playing the clarinet, and became the composer of many popular pieces. However, he remained poor. Abundio became a victim of tuberculosis on April 26, 1914, in Mexico City. He was buried in the Pantheon of Dolores. Thirty years later, the inhabitants of Huichapan erected a monument in his honor.

Compositions
 "Arpa de Oro" – waltz
 "En es Espacio" - waltz
 "Hidalguense" - paso doble
 "Liras Hermanas" - danza
 "≥s" – waltz
 "Morir de Amor" – danza
 "Noche apacible" – waltz
 "Para que sepas lo que es amar" – danza
 "Sonrisas de Angel" – waltz
 "Te amo, te adoro" – waltz

References

1875 births
1914 deaths
Mexican composers
Musicians from Hidalgo (state)
People from Huichapan